Conchatalos spinula is a species of sea snail, a marine gastropod mollusk in the family Muricidae, the murex snails or rock snails.

Description
The length of the shell attains 6.7 mm.

Distribution
This marine species occurs off the Fidji Islands.

References

 Houart, R. & Héros, V., 2008. Muricidae (Mollusca: Gastropoda) from Fiji and Tonga. Mémoires du Muséum national d'Histoire naturelle 196: 437-480

Gastropods described in 2008
Conchatalos